The Hippopotamus is a 2017 British film, adapted from Stephen Fry's 1994 novel of the same name. Filmed in 2015 under the direction of John Jencks, the film chronicles a failed poet who is summoned to his friend's country manor to investigate a series of unexplained miracles.

Plot
Edward "Ted" Wallace is an ageing, jaded writer and former poet. Having not written a poem since 1987, he is stuck writing reviews of small-time plays, wallowing in his bath and compulsively drinking. After shouting at the cast and director at a poorly performed play leads to him being thrown out and fired from his position as a critic, Ted runs into his god daughter Jane, who lavishly pays him to investigate a series of miracles occurring at her family's manor in light of her unexplained apparent recovery from leukaemia.

At the manor, owned by his former friend Michael, Lord Logan, Ted becomes acquainted with his sixteen-year-old godson, David, who displays an unusual fascination with sex and nature. Also at the manor is David's brother Simon, Michael's angina-afflicted friend Oliver, who hopes to obtain funding for his new play and Valerie Richmond, a wealthy Frenchwoman who seeks to purchase one of the manor's horses, Lilac, for her socially awkward daughter Clara, who is accompanying her. For the next few days, Ted becomes acquainted with the manor's residents, encountering conflict between his abrasive attitude and the others' perky optimism, while David converses with Ted about both his interests and his ambitions of becoming a fellow poet.

One day, Lilac mysteriously falls ill of what appears to be ragwort poisoning, something which strikes Michael and Simon as odd as ragwort doesn't grow in the area. While Michael and company despair over the possibility of having to euthanise Lilac, Ted learns from various members of his god-family that the miracles he was sent to investigate were performed by David. According to this account, David had healed his mother from a severe asthma attack simply by touching her, when Simon's CPR seemed ineffective and cured Jane's leukaemia over the course of a few days through the same method. The following day, David appears to perform more miracles by curing Lilac's ragwort poisoning and Oliver's angina, leading Valerie to pursue him in hopes of improving Clara's appearance.

David has gone missing, leading to a search across the manor's grounds. Ted eventually sights David and Clara running into the woods afterwards and gives chase, only to find Clara performing fellatio on David. A bewildered Ted simply chooses to observe them as an ejaculating David tries to coerce Clara into swallowing his semen; Simon then discovers the pair and interrupts them, causing a panicked Clara to bite David's penis. After Simon takes Clara back to the manor, Ted comes out of hiding and drives a bleeding David to the hospital. On the way back, David explains to Ted that he believes his healing powers come from his moral purity and a spiritual connection with nature, channelled though his hands and especially his bodily fluids; Ted rubbishes this as blind delusion, leading a heartbroken David to abandon him.

Once Ted returns to the manor, he is confronted by Michael's sister Rebecca, who bears a grudge against Ted for him publicly humiliating her on live television many years ago; Rebecca insults Ted and rebukes him for his interference in Michael's family's life, leaving Ted to sulk alone in his room for the rest of the night. He comes to an unexpected realisation when he accidentally knocks over and smashes his whisky bottle.

The following evening, the manor's residents agree publicly to announce David's miraculous healing abilities, only for Ted to rebut them as mere coincidence. Ted explains that the breaking of his whisky bottle led him to realise that Lilac's poisoning was actually a hangover from drinking the contents of a bottle he dropped in an outdoor bucket earlier in the film, that Simon's CPR had rescued his mother during her asthma attack and that Jane's recovery from leukaemia was a remission of its symptoms. Ted further reveals David's confidence in his semen's abilities and that this led him to have morally dubious sex with Jane, Lilac and Oliver. Ted's acidic lecture disgusts and angers the residents of the manor and leads an eavesdropping David to attempt suicide by burying himself alive. The others discover David's absence and rescue him before Ted is forced to deliver the unfortunate news that Jane's leukaemia has killed her.

Time passes and the group has moved on from the events of that night. At Jane's funeral, David explains to Ted that his new "normal" life is one of hard work. Ted's experiences from the summer at Michael's manor have reignited his sense of wonder; having written five new poems for the first time in nearly 30 years and preparing to write a sixth, a solitary Ted ushers a toast "to miracles".

Cast

References

External links
 
 

2017 films
Films based on British novels
Films about poets
Films set in country houses
British comedy films
Zoophilia in culture
2010s British films